Bellatrix is the feminine form of bellator, the Latin word for warrior. It can also mean:

 Bellatrix (Gamma Orionis), a star in the constellation of Orion
 Bellatrix (band) (1992–2001), a former Icelandic rock band
 Bellatrix, French Navy minesweeping sloop, launched 29 May 1916
 USS Bellatrix, a name common to several ships
 USS Bellatrix (AK-20/AKA-3) (1942–1991), an amphibious cargo ship of the United States Navy
 USS Bellatrix (AF-62) (1961–1968), a combat stores ship of the United States Navy
 USNS Bellatrix (T-AKR-288) (1973– ), a ship of the United States Navy
 Bellatrix Lestrange, a character from the Harry Potter novels
 Bellatrix Aerospace, an Indian private aerospace manufacturer and small satellite company
 Bellatrix Female Warriors, a British Women's professional wrestling promotion
 Bellatrix - former UK and World Beatbox Champion
 Bellatrix, the codename for a cancelled implementation of the IBM Amazon instruction set architecture.